Berlin, Staatliche Museen, pap. 11529 is a fragment of 2nd century papyrus manuscript containing an unidentified Greek mathematical text and is one of the oldest extant illustrated Greek papyrus roll fragments. One side of the fragment contains a property deed dated 138. The other side contains two columns of text which consists of a series of geometrical and stereometrical propositions. Each proposition is illustrated with a crudely drawn diagram. Several lines of text in each proposition were left shorter than the remainder of the text lines in order to leave space in the right of the column for the illustrations. The left column has a parallelogram, and two right-angled triangles, while the right has an equilateral triangle, a stone, and two concentric circles.

References
 Kurt Weitzmann, Illustrations in Roll and Codex: A study in the method of text illustration (Princeton: Princeton University Press, 1970), pg. 48

Further reading 
W. Schubart, "Mathematische Aufgaben auf Papyrus", Amtl. Berichte der Berliner Museen, XXXVII, 1915–1916.

Papyri of the Berlin State Museums